Shuhei Fukuda  (Japanese:福田 秀平, born February 10, 1989) is a Japanese professional baseball player for the Chiba Lotte Marines of the Nippon Professional Baseball (NPB). He previously played for the Fukuoka SoftBank Hawks. He played for the Brisbane Bandits of the Australian Baseball League in 2010.

Career
On November 26, 2019, Fukuda signed with the Chiba Lotte Marines.

References

External links

NPB stats

1989 births
Living people
Brisbane Bandits players
Fukuoka SoftBank Hawks players
Gigantes de Carolina players
Japanese expatriate baseball players in Puerto Rico
Nippon Professional Baseball outfielders
Baseball people from Kanagawa Prefecture
Japanese expatriate baseball players in Australia